William Craven, 5th Baron Craven (19 September 1705 – 17 March 1769) was an English nobleman and Member of Parliament.

He was born the son of John Craven of Whitley, Coventry in Warwickshire and educated at Emmanuel College, Cambridge.

He was the Member of Parliament for Warwickshire from 24 December 1746 to 10 November 1764.

In 1749 he married Jane, the daughter of the Rev. Rowland Berkeley of Cotheridge, Worcestershire but had no children. He succeeded his cousin, Fulwar Craven, as Baron Craven in 1764, inheriting and residing at Coombe Abbey in Warwickshire.

He was succeeded in turn by his nephew William Craven, 6th Baron Craven, the son of his brother John.

References

1705 births
1769 deaths
People from Coventry
Alumni of Emmanuel College, Cambridge
Members of the Parliament of Great Britain for English constituencies
British MPs 1741–1747
British MPs 1747–1754
British MPs 1754–1761
British MPs 1761–1768
William
5